The Tupolev ANT-41 was a prototype Soviet twin-engined torpedo-bomber of the 1930s.  A single prototype was built, which was destroyed in a crash.  No production followed, with the Ilyushin DB-3 serving as a torpedo bomber instead.

Design and development
In March 1934, the Tupolev design bureau (OKB) began work on a multi-role aircraft for Soviet Naval Aviation, intended to serve as a high-speed, long-range torpedo bomber, reconnaissance aircraft and "cruiser" (i.e. long-range heavy fighter), and available in both landplane and floatplane versions. The task of designing the new aircraft, given the OKB designation ANT-41 and the Navy designation T-1 (Torpedonosets – i.e. torpedo carrier) was assigned to the team led by Vladimir Myasishchev.

The ANT-41 was of similar layout to the contemporary SB bomber, which had been designed by another team (led by Alexander Arkhangelsky) at the Tupolev OKB, but was larger and more powerful. Like the SB, it was a mid-winged cantilever monoplane of all-metal stressed skin construction. It was powered by two Mikulin AM-34 liquid-cooled V12 engines in close-fitting cowlings driving 3-bladed propellers and cooled by radiators mounted inside the wings inboard of the engines, which were fed by narrow ducts on the leading edge of the wing. A long (6.5 m (21 ft 4 in)) weapons bay under the fuselage could hold two  torpedoes, or a single  torpedo or an equivalent weight in bombs.  The undercarriage of the landplane version was a retractable tailwheel undercarriage, based on that of the SB but strengthened to deal with the ANT-41's greater weight.

History
The first prototype ANT-41, a landplane, made its maiden flight from Khodynka Aerodrome, Moscow on 2 June 1936, with severe tail flutter encountered. It was destroyed in a crash during the 14th test flight on 3 July 1936, with the test crew escaping by parachute. The accident was caused by flutter causing wing failure, which was traced to inadequate aileron design.  Later that year, the Ilyushin DB-3 was chosen to meet Soviet Naval Aviation's requirements for a torpedo bomber, and the ANT-41 was cancelled, with the second prototype unbuilt.

Specifications

Notes

Citations

References

 Duffy, Paul and Andrei Kandalov. Tupolev: The Man and His Aircraft. Shrewsbury, UK: Airlife, 1996. .
 Gordon, Yefim and Vladimir Rigmant. OKB Tupolev: A History of the Design Bureau and its Aircraft. Hinckley, UK: Midland Publishing, 2005. .
 Gunston, Bill. The Osprey Encyclopedia of Russian Aircraft 1875–1995. London: Osprey, 1995. .
 Gunston, Bill. Tupolev Aircraft since 1922. Annapolis, Maryland, USA: Naval Institute Press, 1995, .

External links
"Мясищев АНТ-41 (Т-1)". Уголок Неба.(in Russian)

1930s Soviet bomber aircraft
ANT-41
Mid-wing aircraft
Aircraft first flown in 1936
Twin piston-engined tractor aircraft